Carl Brian Griffiths (born 16 July 1971) is an English-born Welsh former footballer and manager.

He started his career with Shrewsbury Town in 1988, and after being voted onto the PFA Team of the Year, moved on to Manchester City for £500,000 in October 1993. In August 1995 he transferred to Portsmouth for £200,000, moving on to Peterborough United for £225,000 in March 1996. He joined Leyton Orient for £65,000 in March 1997, where he stayed for four years, interrupted by short spells at Wrexham (on loan) and Port Vale. He played for Luton Town between July 2001 and 2003 following a £65,000 transfer, later dropping into non-league football with Harlow Town, Braintree Town, Brentwood Town, and Maldon Town. He also represented Wales at under-21 level and also for the "B" team. Within his three spells with Leyton Orient he achieved cult status and in 2004 received 9% of the vote for all-time cult hero behind Peter Kitchen and Terry Howard.

Turning to management in 2008, he took charge of Brentwood Town for a year. In 2010, he was made manager of Aveley, before leaving this post the following year.

Playing career
Griffiths started his career with Shrewsbury Town in September 1988 under the stewardship of Ian McNeill. The "Shrews" were relegated out of the Second Division in 1988–89 after finishing five points behind Hull City. They finished 11th in the Third Division in 1989–90 and 18th in 1990–91 under Asa Hartford, before suffering relegation under new boss John Bond in 1991–92 after finishing six points behind 20th place Exeter City, a team they had beaten 6–1 early in the campaign. He scored 27 goals in 1992–93 to become joint-top scorer (with Darren Foreman) in the Third Division. For this achievement he was named on the PFA Team of the Year. Hitting 62 goals in 170 games during a difficult period at the Gay Meadow, he had done enough to be picked up by Brian Horton's Manchester City in October 1993 for a fee of £500,000. He scored four goals in 18 Premier League games in 1993–94 and 1994–95.

He was moved on to Portsmouth as a £200,000 make-weight in the Kit Symons transfer in August 1995. He was utilized almost exclusively as a substitute by manager Terry Fenwick, making just two starts in 1995–96. He moved on to Peterborough United for £225,000 in March 1996. The "Posh" avoided relegation in 1995–96 by a three-point margin. Peterborough could not avoid relegation out of the Second Division in 1996–97, though Griffiths had already arrived back in the Third Division after spending November 1996 on loan at Leyton Orient. Scoring three goals in five games was enough to convince Tommy Taylor to spend £100,000 to bring him to Brisbane Road permanently in March 1997. He found his form with the "O's", and finished as the fifth highest scorer in the Third Division in 1997–98 with 18 league goals. This tally included a hat-trick in an 8–0 demolition of Doncaster Rovers on 28 December. He hit nine goals in 31 games to fire Orient into the play-offs in 1998–99. However, he could not feature in the play-off Final, as he had already left the club. He spent four weeks on loan at Wrexham from 14 January 1999, and found the net in four of his five appearances for Brian Flynn's "Dragons".

He moved to Port Vale in March 1999 for £100,000, as part of new manager Brian Horton's spending spree. Making just three appearances in 1998–99, he played just seven times in 1999–2000, and returned to former club Leyton Orient for £100,000 in December 1999. He scored four times in eleven games in 1999–2000, including a hat-trick in a 5–1 win over Chester at the Deva Stadium on 28 December. He returned to form in 2000–01, hitting 19 goals in 43 appearances to fire Orient into the play-offs, though he did not feature in the play-off Final defeat to Blackpool. In July 2001, he was sold to Joe Kinnear's Luton Town for £65,000. He scored a hat-trick of headers in a 5–1 win over Torquay United at Kenilworth Road on 22 September 2001. However injuries limited him to just ten appearances in 2001–02 and three appearances in 2002–03. Griffiths then moved into non-league football with Harlow Town, Brentwood Town and Braintree Town. In November 2010, at the age of 39, Griffiths was still playing, and scoring, for Barkingside of the Essex Senior League.

Management career
On 24 May 2008, Griffiths was appointed manager of Brentwood Town. He left the club after one season, despite the chairman's open pleas for him to stay. He later was appointed assistant manager at Barkingside of the Essex Senior League.

On 19 November 2010, Aveley announced that Griffiths had been appointed manager of the club with immediate effect and would bring together his ex-management team from Brentwood, consisting of Scott Canham, Gary Foley, Harry McCullum and Dean Parratt. He left Aveley in November 2011.

Career statistics
Source:

Honours
Individual
PFA Team of the Year (Third Division): 1992–93

References

1971 births
Living people
Sportspeople from Oswestry
Welsh footballers
Wales under-21 international footballers
Association football forwards
Shrewsbury Town F.C. players
Manchester City F.C. players
Portsmouth F.C. players
Peterborough United F.C. players
Leyton Orient F.C. players
Wrexham A.F.C. players
Port Vale F.C. players
Luton Town F.C. players
Harlow Town F.C. players
Braintree Town F.C. players
Brentwood Town F.C. players
Maldon & Tiptree F.C. players
Barkingside F.C. players
English Football League players
Premier League players
Isthmian League players
Association football coaches
Welsh football managers
Brentwood Town F.C. managers
Aveley F.C. managers
Isthmian League managers